Aluminium recycling is the process by which scrap aluminium can be reused in products after its initial production. The process involves simply re-melting the metal, which is far less expensive and energy-intensive than creating new aluminium through the electrolysis of aluminium oxide, which must first be mined from bauxite ore and then refined into aluminium oxide using the Bayer process and then refined again into aluminium metal using the Hall–Héroult process.
 
Recycling scrap aluminium requires only 5% of the energy used to make new aluminium from the raw ore. For this reason, approximately 36% of all aluminium produced in the United States comes from old recycled scrap. Used beverage containers are the largest component of processed aluminum scrap, and most of it is manufactured back into aluminium cans.

History
A common practice since the early 1900s and extensively capitalized during World War II, aluminium recycling is not new. It was, however, a low-profile activity until the late 1960s, when the exploding popularity of aluminium beverage cans finally placed recycling into the public consciousness.

Sources for recycled aluminium include aircraft, automobiles, bicycles, boats, computers, cookware, gutters, siding, wire, and many other products that need a strong lightweight material, or a material with high thermal conductivity. As recycling does not transmute the element, aluminium can be recycled indefinitely and still be used to produce any product for which new aluminium could have been used.

Advantages
Aluminium is an infinitely recyclable material, and it takes up to 95 percent less energy to recycle it than to produce primary aluminum, which also limits emissions, including greenhouse gases. Today, about 75 percent of all aluminum produced in history, nearly a billion tons, is still in use.

The recycling of aluminium generally produces significant cost savings over the production of new aluminium, even when the cost of collection, separation and recycling are taken into account. Over the long term, even larger national savings are made when the reduction in the capital costs associated with landfills, mines, and international shipping of raw aluminium are considered.

Energy savings
Recycling aluminium uses about 5% of the energy required to create aluminium from bauxite; the amount of energy required to convert aluminium oxide into aluminium can be vividly seen when the process is reversed during the combustion of thermite or ammonium perchlorate composite propellant.

Aluminium die extrusion is a specific way of getting reusable material from aluminium scraps but does not require a large energy output of a melting process. In 2003, half of the products manufactured with aluminium were sourced from recycled aluminium material.

Environmental savings
The benefit with respect to emissions of carbon dioxide depends in part on the type of energy used. Electrolysis can be done using electricity from non-fossil-fuel sources, such as nuclear, geothermal, hydroelectric, or solar. Aluminium production is attracted to sources of cheap electricity. Canada, Brazil, Norway, and Venezuela have 61 to 99% hydroelectric power and are major aluminium producers. However the anodes widely used in the Hall–Héroult process are made of carbon and are consumed during aluminum production, generating large quantities of carbon dioxide, regardless of electricity source. Efforts are underway to eliminate the need for carbon anodes. The use of recycled aluminium also decreases the need for mining and refining bauxite.

The vast amount of aluminium used means that even small percentage losses are large expenses, so the flow of material is well monitored and accounted for financial reasons. Efficient production and recycling benefits the environment as well.

Process for beverage cans
Aluminium beverage cans are usually recycled by the following method:
Cans are first divided from municipal waste, usually through an eddy current separator, and cut into small, equally sized pieces to lessen the volume and make it easier for the machines that separate them.
Pieces are cleaned chemically/mechanically and blocked to minimize oxidation losses when melted. (The surface of aluminium readily oxidizes back into aluminium oxide when exposed to oxygen.)
Blocks are loaded into the furnace and heated to 750 °C ± 100 °C to produce molten aluminium.
Dross is removed, and the dissolved hydrogen is degassed. (Molten aluminium readily disassociates hydrogen from water vapor and hydrocarbon contaminants.) This is typically done with chlorine and nitrogen gas. Hexachloroethane tablets are normally used as the source for chlorine. Ammonium perchlorate can also be used, as it decomposes mainly into chlorine, nitrogen, and oxygen when heated.
Samples are taken for spectroscopic analysis. Depending on the final product desired, high-purity aluminium, copper, zinc, manganese, silicon, and/or magnesium is added to alter the molten composition to the proper alloy specification. The top-five aluminium alloys produced are 6061, 7075, 1100, 6063, and 2024.
The furnace is tapped, the molten aluminium poured out, and the process is repeated again for the next batch. Depending on the end product, it may be cast into ingots, billets, or rods, formed into large slabs for rolling, atomized into powder, sent to an extruder, or transported in its molten state to manufacturing facilities for further processing.

Ingot production using reverberatory furnaces

The scrap aluminium is separated into a range of categories such as irony aluminium (engine blocks etc.), clean aluminium (alloy wheels). Scraps are classified according to ISRI (Institute of Scrap Recycling Industries).

Depending on the specification of the required ingot casting, it will depend on the type of scrap used in the start melt. Generally, the scrap is charged to a reverberatory furnace (other methods appear to be either less economical and/or dangerous) and melted down to form a "bath". The molten metal is tested using spectroscopy on a sample taken from the melt to determine what refinements are needed to produce the final casts.

After the refinements have been added, the melt may be tested several times to be able to fine-tune the batch to the specific standard.

Once the correct "recipe" of metal is available, the furnace is tapped and poured into ingot moulds, usually via a casting machine. The melt is then left to cool, stacked and sold on as cast silicon–aluminium ingot to various industries for re-use. Mainly, cast alloys like ADC12, LM2, AlSi132, LM24 etc. are produced. These secondary alloys ingots are used in die cast companies.

Tilting rotary furnaces are used for recycling of aluminium scrap, which give higher recovery compared to reverberatory furnaces (Skelner Furnace).

Recycling rates
According to 2020 data from the International Aluminium Institute, the global recycling efficiency rate is 76%. Around 75% of the almost 1.5 billion
tonnes of aluminium ever produced is still in productive use today.

Brazil recycles 98.2% of its aluminium can production, equivalent to 14.7 billion beverage cans per year, ranking first in the world, more than Japan's 82.5% recovery rate. Brazil has topped the aluminium can recycling charts eight years in a row.

Europe

Secondary aluminium recycling

White dross, a residue from primary aluminium production and secondary recycling operations, usually classified as waste, still contains useful quantities of aluminium which can be extracted industrially. The process produces aluminium billets, together with a highly complex waste material. This waste is difficult to manage. It reacts with water, releasing a mixture of gases (including, among others, hydrogen, acetylene, and ammonia) which spontaneously ignites on contact with air; contact with damp air results in the release of copious quantities of ammonia gas. Despite these difficulties, however, the waste has found use as a filler in asphalt and concrete.

See also
Environmental issues with mining
Ferrous metal recycling
Reverse vending machine

References

External links
Secondary Aluminum Smelters of the World - A list of companies who produce secondary aluminium (i.e., recycled or remelted from scrap metal)

Recycling
Recycling by material
Energy conservation